HMS Diadem was a 64-gun third rate ship of the line of the Royal Navy, launched on 19 December 1782 at Chatham. She participated in the Battle of Cape St Vincent in 1797 under Captain George Henry Towry.

In 1798 she was converted to serve as a troopship. On 7 April 1799 she left Portsmouth together with Trompe. They were carry the West York militia to Dublin.

In 1800 under the command of Post Captain Sir Thomas Livingstone she was employed in the expedition to Quiberon and Belle Île under Sir Edward Pellew, subsequently she was employed in the expedition to Cádiz under Admiral Lord Keith.

Because Diadem served in the navy's Egyptian campaign between 8 March 1801 and 2 September, her officers and crew qualified for the clasp "Egypt" to the Naval General Service Medal that the Admiralty authorised in 1850 to all surviving claimants.

Between April and July 1810 Diadem was at Chatham being fitted for service as a troopship of 28 guns. In June Captain John Phillimore (or Philmore) commissioned her for Lisbon. She then spent some time working with the Spanish anti-French forces on the north coast of Spain. In January 1812 she carried released Danish prisoners of war from Plymouth to Chatham.

On 7 October Diadem captured the American letter of marque .

Later, she sailed to the Halifax station.

Fate
Diadem was broken up in September 1832.

Notes and citations
Notes

Citations

References

Lavery, Brian (2003) The Ship of the Line - Volume 1: The development of the battlefleet 1650-1850. Conway Maritime Press. .
Lyon, David (1993) The Sailing Navy List. Conway Maritime Press. .
Leask, David (2008) Website on the History of Westquarter

O’Byrne, William R. (1849) A naval biographical dictionary: comprising the life and services of every living officer in Her Majesty's navy, from the rank of admiral of the fleet to that of lieutenant, inclusive. (London: J. Murray), vol. 1.

External links
 

Ships of the line of the Royal Navy
Intrepid-class ships of the line
1782 ships
War of 1812 ships of the United Kingdom